Montecarlo Gran Casinò (i.e. "Monaco Gran Casino") is a 1987 Italian comedy film directed by Carlo Vanzina.

Plot  
Misadventures of five Italians at the Monte Carlo Casino: a penniless playboy lives off money from an ugly billionaire to support his gambling habit; two businessmen lose the money they needed to conclude an important deal; two cheaters, after an epic night, manage to defeat an unbeatable French card player.

Cast 
 Massimo Boldi as Gino 
 Christian De Sica as Furio
 Ezio Greggio as Oscar
 Paolo Rossi as Paolo
 Florence Guérin as Sylvia
 Lisa Stothard as Patrizia
 Enrico Beruschi as Lino 
 Philippe Leroy as Baron Duroc de Rothschild
 Guido Nicheli as Ambrogio Colombo
 Renzo Ozzano as Butler
 Mario Brega as Luciano
 Lucia Stara as Magda

See also       
 List of Italian films of 1987

References

External links

1987 films
1980s buddy comedy films
Films directed by Carlo Vanzina
Italian buddy comedy films
Films about gambling
1980s Italian-language films
1980s Italian films